Ireland competed at the 2007 World Championships in Athletics in Osaka, Japan.  The Irish team was made up of 15 athletes competing in 13 events.  Despite not winning any medals, the team was thought to have performed excellently by Irish commentators.  Ireland's highest placed finishers were Eileen O'Keefe in the women's hammer throw and Robert Heffernan in the men's 20K walk, both of whom finished in 6th place.  Only one national record was set, by Joanne Cuddihy in the women's 400m semi-final.  Despite none of them making the final, Ireland's sprinters were perhaps the most impressive performers with David Gillick, Paul Hession, Derval O'Rourke and Cuddihy all reaching the semi-finals and being ranked inside the top 16.

Results by event

Men's competition

200 m
 Paul Hession
 Round 1 — 2nd - 20.46 
 Round 2 — 1st - 20.50
 Semi Final — - 6th - 20.50 (did not advance)

400 m
 David Gillick
 Round 1 — 3rd - 45.35 
 Semi Final — 6th - 45.37 (Did not advance)

800 m
 David Campbell
 Round 1 — 7th - 1.46.77 (Did not advance)

5,000 m
 Alistair Cragg
 Round 1 —  13th - 13:59.45 (Did not advance)

20K Walk
 Robert Heffernan
 Final — 6th - 1:23:42

50K Walk
 Colin Griffin 
 Final — DQ
Jamie Costin
 Final — DNF

Women's competition

400 m
 Joanne Cuddihy
 Round 1 — 3rd - 51.55
 Semi-Final — 50.73 (New National Record) (Did not advance)

5,000 m
 Mary Cullen
 Round 1 — 11th - 15:40.53 (Did not advance)

100 m Hurdles
 Derval O'Rourke
 Round 1 — 4th - 12.91 
 Semi final — 8th - 12.98 (Did not advance)

3000 m Steeplechase
 Roísín McGettigan
 Semi-Final — 4th - 9:39.41 
 Final — 10th - 9:39.80
 Fionnuala Britton
 Semi-Final — 7th - 9:42.38 
 Final — 12th - 9:48.09

20K Walk
 Olive Loughnane 
 Final — 17th - 1:36:00

Hammer Throw
 Eileen O'Keefe
 Qualifying — 5th - 71.07 m
 Final - 6th - 70.93 m

Competitor summary 

Note 
David Campbell was originally selected for the 800m and 1,500m but only ran the 1,500m
Paul Hession was selected for 100m and 200m but ran only the 200m

References

Nations at the 2007 World Championships in Athletics
2007
Athletics